Postplatyptilia machupicchu is a moth of the family Pterophoridae. It is known from Peru.

The wingspan is about 20 mm. Adults are on wing in August.

References

machupicchu
Moths described in 1996